The 1929 Swedish Ice Hockey Championship was the eighth season of the Swedish Ice Hockey Championship, the national championship of Sweden. IK Gota won the championship.

Tournament

Qualification round 
 Nacka SK - IFK Stockholm 5:4
 Lidingö IF - IF Mode 3:1
 UoIF Matteuspojkarna - IF Linnéa 2:1

Quarterfinals 
 IK Göta - Djurgårdens IF 0:0/1:0
 Nacka SK - Lidingö IF 4:3
 Södertälje SK - Karlbergs BK 3:1
 Hammarby IF - UoIF Matteuspojkarna 7:1

Semifinals 
 IK Göta - Nacka SK 4:1
 Södertälje SK - Hammarby IF 5:0

Final 
 IK Göta - Södertälje SK 2:1

External links
 Season hockeyarchives.info

Cham
Swedish Ice Hockey Championship seasons